This is a list of caves in Tanzania.

Tanzania mainland
Amboni Caves, Tanga 
Matumbi Caves, near Kilwa
 Grotte de Nduli, Kibata
 Mumba Cave
 Nandembo Cave System, Kibata (Nan'goma Cave, Nakitara, etc.)

Gallery

See also 
 List of caves
 Speleology

References

 
Tanzania
Caves